Logan T. Webb (born November 18, 1996) is an American professional baseball pitcher for the San Francisco Giants of Major League Baseball (MLB). He was drafted by the Giants out of high school in the fourth round of the 2014 Major League Baseball draft. He made his MLB debut in 2019.

Early life
Webb attended Rocklin High School in Rocklin, California, where in his senior season he had an 0.49 ERA and struck out 73 batters in 57.2 innings, threw a 96 mph fastball, and earned Bee All-Metro and Cal-Hi Sports All-State honors.

Professional career

2014–16 
Webb was drafted by the San Francisco Giants in the fourth round of the 2014 Major League Baseball draft, and signed for a signing bonus of $600,000, above the $440,600 designated by Major League Baseball for where he was drafted. He made his professional debut with the Arizona League Giants, pitching four innings, at 17 years of age.

Webb played 2015 with the Salem-Keizer Volcanoes where he compiled a 3–6 record with a 4.92 ERA in 14 starts, and 2016 with the Augusta GreenJackets where he went 2–3 with a 6.21 ERA in nine starts. In 2016, he underwent Tommy John surgery.

2017–20 
Webb returned to Salem-Keizer in 2017, pitching to a 2–0 record with a 2.89 ERA in 28 relief innings pitched, in which he struck out 31 batters. In 2018, Webb pitched for the San Jose Giants and Richmond Flying Squirrels, posting a combined 2–5 record with a 2.41 ERA in 27 games (26 starts). He was named a CAL mid-season All Star.

The Giants added Webb to their 40-man roster after the season. He began 2019 with Richmond. On May 1, 2019, Webb was suspended for 80 games for testing positive for dehydrochlormethyltestosterone, an anabolic-androgenic steroid. Despite testing positive for the drug, he professed his innocence and confusion. In a formal statement by Webb released by MLB Pipeline, Webb wrote that he had "done research" and submitted "supplements and products for testing" to find out how the dehydrochlormethyltestosterone entered his system, but to no avail. He added, "I know in my heart that something someday will be put into the world to prove my innocence" and "I love this game and respect it too much to ever cheat it". He then apologized for bringing "negative attention" to his "family, friends, teammates, & the San Francisco Giants" and promised to "be back better than ever" after his suspension.

On August 17, 2019, the Giants promoted Webb to the major leagues. He made his major-league debut that night versus the Arizona Diamondbacks, allowing one run while striking out seven batters over five innings. In 2019 in the minor leagues, with four teams he was 2–4 with a 1.85 ERA in 12 games (10 starts) covering  innings and striking out 69 batters. With the Giants in 2019 he was 2–3 with a 5.22 ERA in 8 starts covering  innings and striking out 37 batters.

In the pandemic-shortened 2020 season, Webb was 3–4 with a 5.47 ERA and 46 strikeouts in  innings, and tied for the NL lead in HBP with 7.

2021 
In the 2021 regular season, Webb was 11–3 with a 3.03 ERA. In 27 games (26 starts), he had 158 strikeouts in  innings, and averaged 7.8 hits, 2.2 walks, and 9.6 strikeouts per 9 innings. His salary was $583,000. Webb was the starting pitcher in the last game of the season, with the Giants having a one-game lead in the National League West over the Los Angeles Dodgers. He pitched seven innings and hit his first career home run in an 11–4 victory. It was the last home run hit by a pitcher before the full-time adoption of the designated hitter by the National League in 2022.

In the playoffs, he pitched  innings, giving up one run and one walk while striking out 17 batters. In Game 1, Webb became the third pitcher in franchise history to pitch  innings, allow no runs, and strike out at least 10 batters in a postseason game (joining Madison Bumgarner (2014) and Tim Lincecum (2010)). In Game 5, he joined Bumgarner, Christy Mathewson, Ryan Vogelsong, and Jack Sanford as the only pitchers in franchise history with multiple appearances of seven innings and one earned run or fewer in a single playoff series.

2022 
Webb was the Giants' opening-day starter for the 2022 regular season. In 32 games (all starts) for the season, he was 15–9 with a 2.90 ERA. He had 163 strikeouts in  innings, and averaged 8.1 hits, 2.3 walks, 7.6 strikeouts, and only 0.5 home runs allowed per 9 innings. He ranked 5th among National League pitchers in wins, 7th in ERA and innings pitched, second in home runs per 9 innings, and 9th in wins above replacement.  Webb was the first Giants pitcher to win 15 or more games in a regular season since Madison Bumgarner and Johnny Cueto both accomplished the feat in 2016. He finished in 11th place in National League Cy Young Award voting. 

On January 13, 2023, Webb agreed to a one-year, $4.6 million contract with the Giants for the 2023 season, avoiding salary arbitration.

International career
On December 1, 2022, Webb was announced as a member of the United States national baseball team for the 2023 World Baseball Classic.

In February 2023, Webb did not appear on the announced Team USA WBC roster. At a Giants fan event on February 4, Webb had declined to answer WBC-related questions. Webb cited a desire to play with the Giants for the duration of their Spring Training camp as a motivation for his decision to opt out.

Pitching style 
Webb is a right-handed sinkerballer who primarily relies on a mix of his sinker, slider, and changeup. His pitching repertoire also includes a four-seam fastball which he throws much less frequently. Webb throws from a low arm slot that maximizes the unique movement of his pitches.

Personal life
On December 5, 2021, Webb married Sharidan Morales in Roseville, California.

See also
List of baseball players who underwent Tommy John surgery

References

External links

1996 births
Living people
People from Rocklin, California
Baseball players from California
Major League Baseball pitchers
San Francisco Giants players
Arizona League Giants players
Salem-Keizer Volcanoes players
Augusta GreenJackets players
San Jose Giants players
Richmond Flying Squirrels players
Sacramento River Cats players
American sportspeople in doping cases
Baseball players suspended for drug offenses